Wildlife Service may refer to:

Canadian Wildlife Service
Kenya Wildlife Service
National Parks and Wildlife Service (disambiguation)
National Parks and Wildlife Service (New South Wales)
New Zealand Wildlife Service
Queensland Parks and Wildlife Service
Sydney Metropolitan Wildlife Service
Tasmania Parks and Wildlife Service
United States Fish and Wildlife Service

See also
Wildlife Services